Rosina Hodde (born 10 February 1983) is a Dutch hurdler. She competed in the 60 metres event at the 2014 IAAF World Indoor Championships.

References

External links

1983 births
Living people
Dutch female hurdlers
Sportspeople from Dordrecht
21st-century Dutch women